Tin Woodman is a science fiction novel written by Dennis Russell Bailey and David Bischoff. It was first published in 1979. The story, about a psychic who makes contact with a sentient spacecraft, was adapted into a Star Trek: The Next Generation episode.

Plot summary

A young psychic boy is taken aboard a starship at the request of the government. The boy is considered both a misfit and dangerous because he has the ability to read minds on earth. However, once aboard he travels into deep space where he comes into contact with a sentient starship. The mission of the crew is to somehow communicate with the alien craft and bring it back to earth. However, things don't go to plan when the young psychic makes contact and decides to take matters into his own hands.

Publication history

1979, USA, Doubleday , Pub date 1 April 1979, Hardback
1980, UK, Sidgwick & Jackson, Pub date 1980, Hardback
1980, UK, Readers Union/The Science Fiction Book Club [UK], Pub date 1980, Hardback
1982, USA, Ace Books, Pub date, Feb 1982, Paperback
1982, UK, Sidgwick & Jackson, Pub date 1980, Omnibus Hardback
1983  France, Les Enfants du Voyage, Opta (OPTA - Galaxie Bis #96), Cover: J. L. Verdier, 206pp, Pub date Dec 1983, Paperback
1985, USA, Ace Books, Cover: Walter Velez, Pub date, Dec. 1985, Paperback

Explanation of the novel's title

The name Tin Woodman is derived from The Wonderful Wizard of Oz Tin Woodman character. The name is used as a euphemism for the alien, the subject of the novel, who like the Woodman seeks happiness by having its heart restored.

Adaptations

The novel was based on a short story of the same name, which was nominated for a Nebula Award in 1977.

This book was adapted into a Star Trek: The Next Generation episode, "Tin Man", also written by Bischoff & Bailey. The core story comes from the novel, but the novel itself was not associated with the Star Trek universe. Many changes had to be made to adapt the story into the Star Trek universe, such as the characterization of the crew, and the book's ending.

References

External links

1979 American novels
1979 science fiction novels
American science fiction novels
Doubleday (publisher) books